In the U.S., monition refers to a summons.
In English law and the canon law of the Church of England, a monition, contraction of admonition, is  an order to a member of the clergy to do or refrain from doing a specified act. Other than a rebuke, it is the least severe censure available against clergy of the Church of England. Failure to observe the order is an offence under the Ecclesiastical Jurisdiction Measure 1963. A monition can be imposed in person by a bishop or by an ecclesiastical court.

Historically, monitions of a disciplinary character were used to enforce residence on the holder of a benefice, or in connection with actions to restrain allegedly unlawful ritual practices under the Public Worship Regulation Act 1874. Disobedience to such monitions historically entailed the penalties of contempt of court.

References

Canon law of the Church of England
English legal terminology